"You All Dat" is a song recorded by the Bahamian group, Baha Men featuring uncredited guest vocals from American vocalist Imani Coppola. Originally on 2 Zero 0-0, a re-recorded version was released in January 2001 as the second and final single from their album, Who Let the Dogs Out following the departure of original lead singer Nehemiah Hield. It reached the top 10 in Australia and reached the top 20 in the United Kingdom.

Content
The song, which samples "The Lion Sleeps Tonight", is about a man trying to seduce a woman at a party.

A "clean" edit changes the line "You gotta have balls or you ain't gonna get none" to "You gotta be bold or you ain't gonna get none."

Track listings
CD maxi – Europe
 "You All Dat" (Radio Edit) – 3:32
 "You All Dat" (Berman Brother Radio Edit) – 3:51
 "You All Dat" (Berman Brothers Remix Instrumental) – 3:49
 "You're Mine" – 3:46

Charts and sales

Weekly charts

Year-end charts

In popular media
The song was featured in season 2, episode 15 ("The Grandparents") of Malcolm in the Middle. It was also included on the show's soundtrack, Music from Malcolm in the Middle, released in 2000.

References

2000 songs
2001 singles
Baha Men songs
Imani Coppola songs
Mercury Records singles
Songs written by Mark Hudson (musician)